The 2005–06 Season of BAI Basket (28th edition) ran from February 3, through June 10, 2006 and was contested by ten teams in a round robin system at three rounds. Petro Atlético was the winner.

BAI Basket Participants (2005–06 Season)

BAI Basket Squads (2005–06 Season)
BAI Basket Squads (2005–06 Season)

Final standings

Awards
2006 BAI Basket MVP
 

2006 BAI Basket Top Scorer
 

2006 BAI Basket Top Rebounder
 

2006 BAI Basket Top Assists

See also
 2006 Angola Basketball Cup
 2006 Angola Basketball Super Cup
Federação Angolana de Basquetebol

External links
Official Website 
Eurobasket.com League Page

References

Angolan Basketball League seasons
League
Angola